is a district located in Nagasaki Prefecture, Japan.

As of January 1, 2009, the district has an estimated population of 72,238 and a density of 1460 persons per km2. The total area is 49.54 km2.

Towns and villages
Nagayo
Togitsu

Mergers
 January 1, 1955 the village of Fukuda merged into the city of Nagasaki.
On January 4, 2005 six towns, Iōjima, Kōyagi, Nomozaki, Sanwa, Sotome and Takashima merged into the city of Nagasaki.
On March 1, 2005 the town of Tarami, along with the towns of Iimori, Konagai, Moriyama and Takaki, all from Kitatakaki District, merged into the expanded city of Isahaya.
On April 1, 2005 the old town of Saikai absorbed the towns of Ōseto, Ōshima, Sakito and Seihi to form the new city of Saikai.
On January 4, 2006 the town of Kinkai merged into the city of Nagasaki.

Districts in Nagasaki Prefecture